Bertrand of Provence may refer to:

Fulk Bertrand of Provence (1018–1051), count of Provence
William Bertrand of Provence (1051–1094), count of Provence